Miloš Gordić (born 5 March 2000) is a Serbian football goalkeeper who plays for AEK Larnaca on loan from Red Star Belgrade.

Career statistics

International

Honours

Club
Red Star Belgrade
 Serbian SuperLiga: 2021–22
 Serbian Cup: 2021–22

References

External links
 
 

2000 births
Living people
Association football goalkeepers
Serbian footballers
FK Mačva Šabac players
Serbian SuperLiga players
Serbia international footballers
Serbia under-21 international footballers
Red Star Belgrade footballers